The Fourteenth Lover is a surviving  1922 American silent comedy film directed by Harry Beaumont and starring Viola Dana. It was produced and distributed by Metro Pictures.

Plot
As described in a film magazine, Vi (Dana), daughter of the wealthy Mr. Marchmont (Vroom), has grown weary of her thirteen home-grown suitors and decides to turn to their gardener, Richard Hardy (Mulhall). Richard is a handsome but exceedingly stupid gardener who supports his aged mother (Lee) by trimming wealthy people's bushes. However, he has no use for society ladies who cannot cook or sew. Vi throws herself at his feet and learns how to cook to please him, but he is unimpressed. Her society friends tell lies about Richard to her. She goes to his home and compels him to keep her there all night so that he will be forced to marry her. This ends happily when he "consents" to this plan.

Cast
Viola Dana as Vi Marchmont
Jack Mulhall as Richard Hardy
Theodore von Eltz as Clyde Van Ness
Kate Lester as Aunt Letitia
Alberta Lee as Mrs. Hardy
Frederick Vroom as Mr. Marchmont
Fronzie Gunn as Maid

Preservation status
A print of The Fourteenth Lover is preserved by MGM.

References

External links

1922 films
American silent feature films
Films directed by Harry Beaumont
Metro Pictures films
American black-and-white films
Silent American comedy films
1922 comedy films
1920s American films